Valeriy Volodymyrovych Atrashchenkov (born 20 August 1984) is a Ukrainian badminton player. He started playing badminton at the Kharkiv Polytechnic Institute Sports Centre in 1995, and made his international debut in 2000. Atrashchenkov was part of the national team that placed fourth in the Thomas Cup qualification in 2010 European Men's Team Championships.

Achievements

BWF International Challenge/Series 
Men's singles

Men's doubles

Mixed doubles

  BWF International Challenge tournament
  BWF International Series tournament
  BWF Future Series tournament

References

External links 
 

Living people
1984 births
Sportspeople from Kharkiv
Ukrainian male badminton players
Badminton players at the 2019 European Games
European Games competitors for Ukraine
21st-century Ukrainian people